Global Climate Strike may refer to:

 Climate Strike of November 2015, a worldwide climate strike occurring on 30 November 2015 in parallel to the 2015 United Nations Climate Change Conference
 Global Climate Strike for Future, the first global climate strike of the Fridays for Future movement on 15 March 2019
 Global Climate Strike of May 2019, the second global climate strike of the Fridays for Future movement on 24 May 2019
 Global Climate Strike of September 2019, the third global climate strike of the Fridays for Future movement on 20 September 2019 precluding the 2019 United Nations Climate Action Summit
 Global Climate Strike of November 2019, the fourth global climate strike of the Fridays for Future movement on 29 November 2019  three days before the start of the United Nations Climate Change Conference (COP25) in Madrid

See also
 School strike for climate
 List of school climate strikes
 List of environmental protests